KBZI (106.1 FM) is a radio station licensed to Mooreland, Oklahoma, United States. The station is currently owned by William Wachter, through licensee One Media, Inc.

KBZI broadcasts an 80's rock format to the Woodward, Oklahoma, area.

History
This station was assigned call sign KBZI on January 24, 2017.

References

External links

BZI
Radio stations established in 2017
2017 establishments in Oklahoma